Dakota MRT station is an underground Mass Rapid Transit (MRT) station on the Circle line in Geylang planning area, Singapore, next to Geylang River.

Located along Old Airport Road between the junctions of Jalan Dua and Dakota Crescent, Dakota station took its name from the Dakota DC-3 aircraft that used to frequently land at the former Kallang Airport. This station primarily serves the Old Kallang Airport Estate, and is within walking distance to Mountbatten MRT station.

History

Before the station was built, it was originally known as Tanjong Katong. As Tanjong Katong is too far away, it was renamed to Dakota in March 2005. Construction started in October that year. The old Guillemard Camp Road was widened to provide public buses enough space to drive through. Despite the widening of the road. The closed stretch of Old Airport Road has since re-opened on 29 December 2008 at 5am.

Art in Transit
The artwork featured in this station is Little things, little stories by A Dose of Light (Ang Song Nian and Zhao Renhui). This artwork narrates an open-ended story of Dakota Crescent through the objects inside residents’ homes, along the HDB flat corridors and shared outdoor spaces which attempt to chronicle a visual history and narrative of the space before the station is built.

References

External links

 

Railway stations in Singapore opened in 2010
Geylang
Kallang
Mass Rapid Transit (Singapore) stations